Elkhorn or Elk Horn may refer to:

Places

Antarctica
 Elkhorn Ridge, a ridge of the Convoy Range in Victoria Land

Canada
 Elkhorn, Manitoba, an unincorporated community
 Elkhorn Mountain, a mountain in British Columbia

United States

Cities and communities
 Elkhorn, California, a census-designated place
 Elkhorn, California, former name of Fremont, Yolo County, California
 Elk Horn, Iowa, a city
 Elk Horn, Kentucky, an unincorporated community
 Elkhorn City, Kentucky, a city
 Elkhorn Park, Lexington, Kentucky, a neighborhood
 Elkhorn, Missouri, an unincorporated community
 Elkhorn, Montana, a census-designated place
 Elkhorn, Nebraska, a former city and neighborhood within Omaha
 Elkhorn, West Virginia, an unincorporated community
 Elkhorn, Wisconsin, a city
 Forks of Elkhorn, Kentucky, an unincorporated community
 Elkhorn Township (disambiguation), multiple places

Bodies of water
 Elk Horn Creek, a stream in Iowa
 Elkhorn Creek (disambiguation), multiple places
 Elkhorn Lake, a lake in Minnesota
 Elkhorn River, a river in Nebraska
 Elkhorn Slough, a tidal slough and estuary on Monterey Bay in California
 Lake Elkhorn, manmade lake in Columbia, Maryland

Mountains and formations
 Elkhorn Formation, a geologic formation in Ohio
 Elkhorn Hills, a low mountain range in California
 Elkhorn Mountain (Washington), a mountain in Washington
 Elkhorn Mountains, a mountain range in Montana
 Elkhorn Mountains (Oregon), a mountain range in Oregon
 Elkhorn Peak, a summit of the Wallowa Mountains in Oregon

Other
 Elkhorn National Forest, a former national forest in Montana
 Elkhorn Ranch, a ranch built by Theodore Roosevelt near Medora, North Dakota
 Elkhorn Road, a street in Las Vegas, Nevada
 Elkhorn Tavern, a historic tavern in Pea Ridge, Arkansas
 Fremont, Elkhorn and Missouri Valley Railroad, sometimes called "the Elkhorn", a railroad in Nebraska

Biology
 Euphorbia lactea, plant also called Elkhorn
 Platycerium fern, also known as Elkhorn fern
 Elkhorn coral, Acropora palmata

Other uses
 Elkhorn (sculpture), a work by Lee Kelly in West Haven-Sylvan, Oregon, US